Dar Balut-e Sofla (also Romanized as Dār Balūţ-e Soflá; also known as Dār Balūţ-e Pā’īn, Dār Balūţeh Soflá, and Dār Balūt Pāīn) is a village in Beyranvand-e Shomali Rural District, Bayravand District, Khorramabad County, Lorestan Province, Iran. At the 2006 census, its population was 526, in 119 families.

References 

Towns and villages in Khorramabad County